General elections were held in Ethiopia between 1 and 30 September 1957, to elect 210 members of the Chamber of Deputies, the lower house of the Ethiopian parliament (members of the upper house, the Senate, were appointed by the Emperor). These elections followed the new constitution which had been enacted by Emperor Haile Selassie in 1955, and were the first ever held in that ancient country.

Electoral system
The regulations for this election were set forth in Proclamation 152 of 1952. This law set up a Central Election Board of three members, which worked with the help of the Ethiopian Ministry of Interior. Each rural constituency of 200,000 eligible voters elected two members for the Chamber. Political parties were not authorized at this time, so competition for office were "reduced to the level of individual competition," according to Bahru Zewdu. "Given the attractive salary of deputies as well as the social status enjoyed by them, that competition was understandably keen. Parliament thus became a vehicle for self-promotion rather than a forum of popular representation."

Universal suffrage was introduced for everyone born in Ethiopia and over 21 in age. The prospective voter was required to have lived in their electoral district for at least one year, not be disqualified by insanity, loss of civil rights pursuant to the penal code law, or be incarcerated. Candidates had to meet specific property qualifications. According to Edmond Keller, "A candidate had to own at least E$ 850 in land in the constituency he proposed to represent, or he had to possess at least E$ 1,700 in moveable property." Along with the relatively expensive cost of campaigning greatly restricted the number of people who could run for office. As a result, a disproportionate number of candidates were from aristocratic families—26%, according to Edmond Keller.

References

External links
"Ethiopia: The Day of Fulfillment", Time magazine, published 11 November 1957

Ethiopia
1957 in Ethiopia
General elections in Ethiopia
Non-partisan elections
Election and referendum articles with incomplete results